Century Days is the third album by Die Kreuzen, released in July 1988 through Touch and Go Records.

Track listing

Personnel 
Die Kreuzen
Keith Brammer – bass guitar
Brian Egeness – guitar, piano
Dan Kubinski – vocals
Erik Tunison – drums
Production and additional personnel
Peter Balistrieri – alto saxophone, baritone saxophone
Tim Cole – trumpet
Richard Kohl – cover art
Die Kreuzen – production, mixing
Butch Vig – production, engineering, mixing
Gene Emery Zanow – cover art

References

External links 
 

1988 albums
Albums produced by Butch Vig
Die Kreuzen albums
Touch and Go Records albums